Jeremy Bates and Jonas Björkman were the defending champions, but chose not to participate that year.

Martin Damm and Anders Järryd won in the final 6–3, 6–2, against Tomás Carbonell and Francisco Roig.

Seeds

  Jacco Eltingh /  Paul Haarhuis (semifinals)
  John-Laffnie de Jager /  Andrei Olhovskiy (semifinals)
  Martin Damm /  Anders Järryd (champions)
  Jakob Hlasek /  Yevgeny Kafelnikov (first round)

Draw

Draw

External links
Draw
Qualifying Draw

Doubles
1995 ATP Tour